The 1888 season was the fifth season of regional competitive association football in Australia. The were two league competitions fielded by Northern District British Football Association (Northern NSW) and the South British Football Soccer Association (New South Wales) and three cup competitions.

League competitions

(Note: figures in parentheses display the club's competition record as winners/runners-up.)

Cup competitions

(Note: figures in parentheses display the club's competition record as winners/runners-up.)

See also
 Soccer in Australia

References

Seasons in Australian soccer
1888 in Australian sport
N
Australian soccer